Carlos de Amésquita (also Carlos de Amézqueta or Carlos de Amézola) was a Spanish naval officer of the 16th century. He is remembered for his raid on English soil, known as the Raid on Mount's Bay, in the context of the Brittany Campaign during the Anglo-Spanish War 1585–1604.

Amésquita commanded three companies and four galleys (named Capitana, Patrona, Peregrina and Bazana). They disembarked at Penmarch on July 26, and in Mount's Bay (Cornwall) on August 2.

After burning the town of Mousehole, Amésquita and his men embarked on their galleys and sailed for two miles, after which they disembarked again, conquered and burned the fort of Penzance down, Newlyn, and Penzance. They celebrated a mass at St. Mary Chapel at Penzance, where they promised to celebrate another mass after England had been defeated.

See also
Fernando Sánchez de Tovar

External links
"The Spanish Attack"

Basque people
Spanish generals
Spanish naval officers
16th-century Spanish military personnel